Letnica is a river of Poland, a tributary of the Obra. The river flows through the town of Letnica, Gdańsk

Rivers of Poland